Sizova Griva is a rural locality (a settlement) in Novotuzukleysky Selsoviet, Kamyzyaksky District, Astrakhan Oblast, Russia. The population was 129 as of 2010. There is 1 street.

Geography 
Sizova Griva is located 39 km east of Kamyzyak (the district's administrative centre) by road. Tuzukley is the nearest rural locality.

References 

Rural localities in Kamyzyaksky District